is a former Nippon Professional Baseball pitcher for the Kintetsu Buffaloes, Yomiuri Giants, and the Yokohama BayStars.

Notes and references

External links

Living people
1964 births
Baseball people from Yokohama
Asia University (Japan) alumni
Japanese baseball players
Nippon Professional Baseball pitchers
Kintetsu Buffaloes players
Yomiuri Giants players
Yokohama BayStars players
Nippon Professional Baseball Rookie of the Year Award winners
Japanese baseball coaches
Nippon Professional Baseball coaches